= Revolutionary coalition =

Concept of group psychology

In psychology, the term revolutionary coalition describes the formation of a within a larger group with the purpose of altering or disrupting existing authority structures. These efforts also typically aim for “a radical and pervasive change in the functioning and structure of the group or organization.”

== Formation ==
Revolutionary coalitions form through the resistance against or the escape from authority's influence within a group. Members of one group assert themselves against a perceived imbalance of power in favor of other group members. This perception typically commences at an individual level. It only leads to subgroup formations if other low-power members of the group feel a sense of shared identity.

== Experiments ==
In one study, members of triads were asked to work under the directions of a leader who had been chosen based on scores on a bogus test of abilities. They were compensated through monetary rewards given out by the leader. The leader was asked to keep more than half of the money earned by the entire group and give each group member less than one-fourth of total earnings. Group members were informed about whether the leader had personally decided how to distribute payment. 58% of participants formed a revolutionary coalition with other low-group members if the leader had personally decided, compared to 25% of group members revolting if the leader had not personally decided.

Another study investigated how collective performance and coalition strength within groups of three could affect the redistribution of status prerogatives. For each triad, hierarchy was established through high control status of one group member and low control status of the two others. Through the performance of ambiguous decision-making tasks over two trials, researchers observed how the two members, acting together as a revolutionary coalition, could potentially damage the outcomes received by the high-status member. They found that the formation of a revolutionary coalition could only reallocate prerogatives if it is supported by a joint effect of collective performance and coalition strength.
